BroadLight is a fabless semiconductor company which designs, manufactures and markets Fiber Access and embedded processors System-on-a-chip (SoC). Founded in 2000 by Ran Dror, David Levi, Haim Ben Amram, Didi Ivancovsky and Raanan Ivry, it is headquartered in Herzeliya, Israel with offices in the United States, China, Taiwan and Korea.

Market 

BroadLight predicted that the fiber-to-the-home market would outpace xDSL copper broadband installations and that the market would require and benefit from highly integrated Fiber Access semiconductor SoC. The company was recognized to achieve significant market share and an established top-tier customer position

Intellectual Property 

Since 2004 BroadLight has been awarded multiple patents in the area of fiber access and CPE network processing.

Acquisition by Broadcom 

In April 2012 Broadcom Corporation acquired BroadLight for $230M in a cash transaction.

References

External links 
 BroadLight homepage

Semiconductor companies of Israel
Broadcom
Fabless semiconductor companies